The  was a Japanese coastal and siege howitzer. It was developed by Armstrong before 1892 and saw service in the Russo-Japanese War during the siege of Port Arthur and the Second Sino-Japanese War.

Design and description
The 28 cm Howitzer L/10 was designed in 1884 by the British Armstrong company.  Armstrong had an Italian subsidiary which produced guns for the Italian Navy and Major Pompeo Grillo, a heavy artillery specialist was hired in April 1884 to help the construction of artillery at a new plant in Osaka.  The description from Brassey's Naval Annual of 1892 reads "The howitzer was a 28-cm rifled breech-loader of cast iron, 9 calibres long made at Osaka, from the designs of guns made for the Italians by Sir W.G. Armstrong".  The Italians produced the design in a number of different lengths and they were designated by their diameter and length in calibers 280/9, 280/10, 280/11, and 280/16.  Some 220 pieces were manufactured by the Osaka Artillery Arsenal for Japanese coastal defence. It was mounted on a turntable which was fixed to a steel firing platform. It required two to four days to emplace for firing. An ammunition crane was fixed to the carriage for ease of loading. The howitzer entered service in 1892 and was installed in shore batteries in forts overlooking Tokyo Bay and Osaka Bay, and had been intended for anti-ship operations. However it saw use as a siege gun during the Russo-Japanese War due to a lack of heavy siege guns.

Combat history

Russo-Japanese War

During the Russo-Japanese War, the Japanese Third Army was besieging Port Arthur. While the capture of Port Arthur had been achieved in a single assault during the First Sino-Japanese War, the situation was different in 1904. The Russians had been in possession of Port Arthur since 1897 and had constructed strong fortifications around the city following the plans of General Eduard Totleben. After the first general assault in August 1904 yielded over 16,000 casualties, General Nogi, the commanding officer of the Japanese forces, requested heavy siege guns. With the arrival of the first battery of 28 cm howitzers, replacing those lost when the transport Hitachi Maru, loaded with a battalion of the First Reserve Regiment of the Guards, was sunk by Russian cruisers in the Hitachi Maru Incident on June 15, 1904, the situation changed. The massive, 11-inch, howitzers could throw a 217 kilogram (478 pound) shell over 7.8 kilometers (4.8 miles), and Nogi then had the firepower necessary to seriously damage the Russian fortifications. The huge shells were nicknamed "roaring trains" by the Russian troops (for the sound they made just before impact), and during their period at Port Arthur over 16,949 of these shells were fired.

At 10:30 on December 5, following another massive artillery bombardment, the Japanese managed to overrun 203 Meter Hill overlooking the harbour of Port Arthur with the Russian Pacific Fleet at anchor. They sent an artillery observer on the hill, directing the fire of the 28 cm howitzer, systematically sinking the Russian fleet, one ship after another. On December 5, 1904, the battleship Poltava was sunk, followed by the battleship Retvizan on December 7, 1904, the battleships Pobeda and Peresvet and the cruisers Pallada and Bayan on December 9, 1904. All six would be raised, repaired, renamed, and recommissioned by the Japanese after the war. The battleship Sevastopol, although hit five times by  shells, managed to move out of range of the guns.

Second Sino-Japanese War
In November 1939 during the Second Sino-Japanese War, 28 cm howitzers were deployed at the Yellow River where they put a railway tunnel out of action for over three months.

World War II
Due to a lack of alternatives, the Japanese reactivated the 28 cm howitzer for coastal defence in 1945, expecting the landing of the Allies. Thirteen guns were in use on Kyushu, six on Shikoku, 62 on Honshu and 10 on Hokkaido.
Also, two batteries of the 28 cm howitzers were used by 132nd Independent Mixed Brigade at Dongning, Heilongjiang, during the Soviet invasion of Manchuria in 1945.
Two batteries of 28 cm howitzers were emplaced with the Najin Fortress Garrison in Rason.

Notes

References
 Kowner, Rotem. Historical Dictionary of the Russo-Japanese War. Scarecrow, 2006 .
 Zaloga, Steven. Defense of Japan 1945. Osprey Publishing,2010 .

External links

 Website about 28-cm-Howitzer, English
 Website about 28-cm-Howitzer in World War II, Japanese

Artillery of Japan
Russo-Japanese war weapons of Japan
World War I artillery of Japan
World War II artillery of Japan
Siege artillery
280 mm artillery
Weapons and ammunition introduced in 1892